Bones is the second studio album by English alternative rock band Young Guns. It was released on in the UK on 3 February 2012 through Wind-up Records and PIAS Recordings, and in the US on 4 September 2012. Five singles were released from the album, the most successful being the second (first single released in the US), "Bones", which topped the Billboard Active Rock charts in May 2013.

Writing and recording
The band's first album, All Our Kings Are Dead, was created largely as a method to continue touring, as the band felt they needed more than the few songs they had from their previous EP, the Mirrors EP. The releases were seen largely as a medium to support their live performances, the band's largest focus at the time. After touring with these two releases for more than two years, the band realized they had built up a considerable fanbase, and decided to write a second album.

Recording for the album started in 2011. The album was recorded at Karma Sound Studios in Thailand with the former SikTh guitarist Dan Weller. Frontman Gustav Wood stated that the album thematically revolved around the concepts "finding inner strength" and the importance of "seizing the moment". He cited the track "Brother in Arms" as a specific example of this, with it being written in regards to "enjoying being alive" during their time in Thailand recording the album.

Release and promotion
Five singles were released from the album. The first single from the album, "Learn My Lesson", was first played on Zane Lowe's BBC Radio 1 show on 13 October 2011 as his Hottest Record in the world, and was made available for download shortly after. In December 2011, a video was posted online for "Brother in Arms". On 2 January 2012, "Bones" received its first broadcast play on Daniel P Carter's Rock Show on Radio 1. On 21 May 2012, the music video for "Dearly Departed", was released, with the single itself being released on 11 June. "Towers (On My Way)" was released as a single on 27 August 2012. On 22 October 2012, the music video for "You Are Not" was released with the single itself released on 26 November.

The album charted at no. 19 in the U.K. Album Chart. The title track was used as one of the theme songs for WrestleMania 29.

Reception

Reception for the album was generally positive, with the album receiving an aggregate score of 74 out of a 100, out of 8 reviews, from Metacritic. Allmusic awarded the album 3 stars with its review by Jon O'Brien stating "Bones is undeniably still a solid follow-up that should consolidate their second-tier status, but they'll have to change the record next time around if they want to move into U.K.'s alt-metal big league."

Track listing

Personnel 
Young Guns
 Gustav Wood – lead vocals
 Fraser Taylor – lead guitar
 John Taylor – rhythm guitar, backing vocals
 Simon Mitchell – bass guitar
 Ben Jolliffe – drums, percussion, backing vocals

Production
 Dan Weller – production, mixing

References

2012 albums
Young Guns (band) albums
PIAS Recordings albums
Wind-up Records albums
Albums produced by Dan Weller